Alma Hinding (1882–1981) was a Danish film actress of the silent era. She acted in films for Nordisk Film during its most successful period.

Selected filmography
 Atlantis (1913)
 The Secret of the Desert (1918)

References

Bibliography
 Milne, Tom. The Cinema of Carl Dreyer. A. S. Barnes, 1971.

External links

1882 births
1981 deaths
Danish film actresses
Danish silent film actresses
20th-century Danish actresses
People from Svendborg